Patrick Connolly-Carew (born 6 March 1938) in an Irish equestrian. He competed at the 1972 Summer Olympics.

References

1938 births
Living people
Irish male equestrians
Olympic equestrians of Ireland
Equestrians at the 1972 Summer Olympics